Mari Eder (née Mari Laukkanen, born 9 November 1987 in Eno, Finland) is a Finnish biathlete and cross-country skier.

Career
Eder competed in the 2010 Winter Olympics for Finland. Her best performance was 43rd in the individual. She also finished 68th in the sprint.

In February 2013, Eder's best performance in the Biathlon World Cup was 7th, as part of the mixed relay team at Kontiolahti in 2011/12. Her best overall finish in the Biathlon World Cup is 36th, in 2011/12. She scored her first World Cup podium finish with a third place in the first of two sprints at the Kontiolahti round of the 2013/14 season.

Up to February 2017 her best performance at the Biathlon World Championships was fourth at Hochfilzen, in Austria in 2017 in the women's individual competition over the normal distance. Her previous best was sixth, as part of the 2009 Finnish mixed relay team. Her previous best individual performance was 15th, in the 2012 sprint. However, in March 2017, she won both the 7.5 km sprint and 10 km pursuit in Holmenkollen.

In addition to biathlon, Eder has also competed in cross-country skiing, mostly in sprints and other short races. She enjoyed particular success at the Under-23 level, finishing on the podium in the individual sprint at the Under-23 World Championships three times, taking third in the 2008 Championships in Malles Venosta, second in the 2009 event at Praz de Lys-Sommand, and taking the gold medal in 2010 in Hinterzarten. In the FIS Cross-Country World Cup, her best results have been fifth places in the individual sprint in Sochi in February 2013, and in the team sprint in Toblach in January 2017. She competed in the cross-country sprint at the 2014 Winter Olympics in Sochi, where she placed 15th.

Biathlon results
All results are sourced from the International Biathlon Union.

Olympic Games
0 medals

a.  The mixed relay was added as an event in 2014.

World Championships
0 medals

a.  During Olympic seasons "Mixed-Relay Championships" were held for those events not included in the Olympic program.
b. The single mixed relay was added as an event in 2019.

Individual podiums
 2 victories – (1 Sp, 1 Pu) 
 3 podiums – (2 Sp, 1 Pu)

Cross-country skiing results
All results are sourced from the International Ski Federation (FIS).

Olympic Games

World Championships

World Cup

Season standings

Personal life
Eder married the Austrian Benjamin Eder on 26 July 2018. She has been living in Austria since 2013.

References 

1987 births
Biathletes at the 2010 Winter Olympics
Biathletes at the 2014 Winter Olympics
Biathletes at the 2018 Winter Olympics
Biathletes at the 2022 Winter Olympics
Finnish female biathletes
Living people
Olympic biathletes of Finland
Finnish female cross-country skiers
Cross-country skiers at the 2014 Winter Olympics
Cross-country skiers at the 2018 Winter Olympics
Olympic cross-country skiers of Finland
People from Joensuu
Sportspeople from North Karelia
21st-century Finnish women